The 17th NKP Salve Challenger Trophy was an Indian domestic cricket tournament that was held in Nagpur from 10 October to 13 October 2011. The series involved the domestic teams from India which were India Blue, India Red, and India Green. India Red and India Green were declared as joint winners, after the final ended in a tie.

Squads

Points Table

Matches

Group stage

Final

References

Indian domestic cricket competitions